Trebišnjica wellspring-group is a system of two geographically and hydrologically distinct principal groupings of strong karstic springs, Trebišnjica and Čeplica, which together constitute source of the Trebišnjica river. Wellsprings are located just below town of Bileća in Bosnia and Herzegovina. The entire area where founts are situated is submerged under Bilećko Lake since 1967, formed after the construction of Trebinje-1 Hydroelectric Power Station and its large arch dam at Grnčarevo village.

Springs
The Trebišnjica river emerges under the karstic plateau on which town of Bileća sits. There are two main spring-groups, first in immediate proximity of town itself, and second little more than 3 kilometers downstream at Čepelica village.

Trebišnjica spring-group
The Trebišnjica spring-group at Bileća, at  a.s.l., is composed of three major wellspring outlets, "Dejanova Pećina", "Vrelo Oko", and "Nikšičko Vrelo".

Čepelica spring-group
Another submerged springs are Čepelica river spring-group ("Čepelica spring-group"), located at Ćepelica village,  further down the stream from first group, at  a.s.l.
The Čepelica spring-group consists of two main karst hydrological features, Wellspring Čepo (Vrelo "Čepo") with three main outlets, and group of smaller estavelles (sinkholes) and springs on the left-bank side of the Čepelica river streambed.

Bileća Lake environmental and ecological impact

Both groups were part of the characteristic Dinaric karst landscape with significant aesthetic value, however entire region surrounding the Trebišnjica headwaters, together with its sources, many villages and productive land is flooded in 1967 by the Bilećko Lake, formed after construction of the Grnčarevo dam, with the primary purpose of serving as an artificial water reservoir for the Trebinje-1 Hydroelectric Power Station turbines.

See also
Neretva
Dinaric Alps
Karstic wellspring

References

Trebišnjica
Subterranean rivers of Bosnia and Herzegovina
Bileća
Karst springs of Bosnia and Herzegovina
Trebišnjica
Caves of Bosnia and Herzegovina
Karst caves of Bosnia and Herzegovina
Lower Horizons Hydroelectric Power Stations System
Dam controversies in Bosnia and Herzegovina
Trebišnjica river damming and regulation controversy